Laguna Sur station is an underground metro station on the Line 5 of Santiago Metro network, in Santiago, Chile. It is located underneath the junction of Teniente Cruz Avenue with Laguna Sur Street, in the commune of Pudahuel between Las Parcelas station (1,140 meters away) and Barrancas station (1,140 meters away).

The station was opened on 3 February 2011 as part of the extension of the line from Pudahuel to Plaza de Maipú. It is one of three stations on the elevated viaduct extension of the line to Maipú.

The station structure consists of two parts: the platforms, located on an elevated viaduct, and the ticket office and entrance points on the Teniente Cruz Avenue / Laguna Sur Street junction. The platforms and ticket office are linked by a footbridge over Teniente Cruz Avenue.

The surrounding area is mainly residential,

Etymology
The station is named after Laguna Sur Street, where it is located.

History
In 2005, Chilean president Ricardo Lagos announced the extension of Line 5 to Maipú. Works began on Laguna Sur station in 2006 and were completed two years later. Construction of the full line extension was completed in 2010 and on October 5, 2010, the first train passed along the station's tracks. Laguna Sur station was finally inaugurated on February 3, 2011, by Chilean president Sebastián Piñera along with the rest of stations on the line extension between Barrancas and Plaza de Maipú stations.
The station has been a catalyst for significant change and development in the area, with improvements in the public lighting, resurfacing of the streets surrounding the station and new residential and commercial development projects.

References

External links
 Metro de Santiago website
 Pudahuel Municipality website, in Spanish

Santiago Metro stations
Santiago Metro Line 5